Gerhard Botz (born 15 September 1955 in Rudolstadt, Bezirk Gera) is a German politician and member of the SPD.

External links 
  
 Biography by German Bundestag 

1955 births
Living people
People from Rudolstadt
People from Bezirk Gera
Members of the 10th Volkskammer
Members of the Bundestag for Thuringia
Members of the Landtag of Thuringia
University of Rostock alumni
Members of the Bundestag 2005–2009
Members of the Bundestag for the Social Democratic Party of Germany